The 1948 LFF Lyga was the 27th season of the LFF Lyga football competition in Lithuania.  It was contested by 19 teams, and Elnias Šiauliai won the championship.

North

South

Final

References
RSSSF

LFF Lyga seasons
1948 in Lithuanian sport
Lith